On February 10, 2008, an arsonist set fire to the historic Namdaemun gate (officially "Sungnyemun") in Seoul, South Korea, causing severe damage to the 550-year-old structure. The monument was subsequently restored and reopened to the public in 2013.

Fire
The fire reportedly broke out at approximately 8:50 p.m. on Sunday, February 10, 2008. Firefighters soon arrived on the scene and started dousing the blaze with water in an attempt to extinguish the fire. Initially, the effort seemed successful: by late Sunday night, firefighters said they believed that they had contained the fire, with only minimal damage done to the wooden structure topping the otherwise stone structure. According to reports, they had been instructed by authorities not to be aggressive in fighting the fire out of fear that the structure would be damaged by the high-pressure water.

After midnight, however, the dying fire suddenly reignited, quickly getting out of control. Despite the efforts of the more than 360 firefighters who were at the scene, the fire soon ended up destroying the entire wooden structure and causing substantial damage to the stone walls. The fire did not result in any injuries.

Arsonist

Originally, the fire had been suspected to be accidental. However, many witnesses reported seeing someone enter the gate shortly before the fire, and two disposable lighters were found where the fire was believed to have started.

Later investigations revealed that the fire was indeed an act of arson. A 69-year-old man, identified as Chae Jong-gi, was taken into police custody on February 12, on the suspicion that it was he who started the fire. Chae confessed to the crime 30 minutes after his arrest. According to police reports, Chae arrived at Namdaemun around 8:35 p.m. carrying an aluminum ladder, three 1.5-liter bottles of paint thinner, and two cigarette lighters. With the ladder, he climbed the western wall of the gate, entered the gate, and walked up to the second floor. There, he started the fire by sprinkling the floor with paint thinner and lighting it. Chae stated that he had started the fire because he was upset about not having been paid in full for land he had sold to developers. Chae had also been charged with setting fire to the Changgyeong Palace complex in Seoul in 2006.

The reason he targeted Namdaemun was because it was easily accessible and was only secured by motion sensors. He also considered attacking trains or buses, but decided against it due to the high number of casualties this would cause.

Aftermath

 
South Korean newspapers blamed the government for failing to provide more security.

The Cultural Heritage Administration of South Korea stated that it would take three years and $21 million to rebuild and restore the historic gate. In 2006, 182 pages of blueprints of the gate had been made as a contingency measure against possible damages, making reconstruction possible.

President Lee Myung-bak proposed starting a private donation campaign to finance the restoration of the gate. Many people felt that the government should pay for the restoration because it had failed to adequately protect the structure. Lee's transitional committee clarified the president-elect's comments by stating that the government would pay for the majority of the restoration.

The restored gate reopened to the public on May 5, 2013, having been rebuilt using traditional tools and techniques. The project cost 25 billion won to complete and includes new fire suppression systems and closed-circuit television cameras.

See also
 Daegu subway fire

References

External links

Pictures published by BBC
Fire ravages South Korea landmark BBC, February 11, 2008
Arrest In Burning Of S. Korean Landmark CBS, February 12, 2008
Arson suspected as blaze destroys South Korea's top cultural monument The Times, February 11, 2008
Suspect held after blaze guts South Korean landmark The Times, February 12, 2008

2008 crimes in South Korea
2008 fires in Asia
2000s in Seoul
Arson in South Korea
Arson in the 2000s
Attacks on buildings and structures in 2008
Attacks on buildings and structures in Asia
Building and structure fires in South Korea
Crime in Seoul
February 2008 crimes
February 2008 events in South Korea
Jung District, Seoul